This is the discography for American jazz singer Lalah Hathaway.

Albums

Singles

Album appearances

Soundtrack appearances

Music videos 
 "Heaven Knows"
 "Baby Don't Cry"
 "Something"
 "Love Like This" (Grover Washington feat. Lalah Hathaway)
 "Let Me Love You"
 "Family Affair"
 "Let Go"
 "Dealing" (Eric Roberson feat. Lalah Hathaway)
 "Little Ghetto Boy" 
 "Mirror" 
 "Ghetto Boy" (Remix feat. Snoop Dogg & Robert Glasper)
 "I Can't Wait" 
 "Honestly"

Concert DVDs 
 The Gospel According to Jazz Chapter 3 DVD (Kirk Whalum feat. Lalah Hathaway et al.) includes the 2011 Grammy winning song "It's What I Do"

References 

Discographies of American artists
Jazz discographies